Kjetil Storesletten (born 1 February 1967) is a Norwegian economist. He is a professor of economics at the University of Minnesota. Between 2009 and 2012, he was a monetary advisor to the Federal Reserve Bank of Minneapolis. He also served as the European Economic Association's president in 2019.

Storesletten graduated from Norwegian School of Economics in 1991, and earned his doctorate in economics from Carnegie Mellon University in 1995, where Finn Kydland was among his teachers.

Selected publications

References

External links 
 Website at the University of Oslo

1967 births
Living people
21st-century Norwegian economists
20th-century Norwegian economists
Carnegie Mellon University alumni
Academic staff of the University of Oslo
Academic staff of Stockholm University
Fellows of the Econometric Society

Fellows of the European Economic Association